Senecio sarcoides (previously S. corymbiferus) is a species of succulent flowering plant in the aster family, indigenous to the Western Cape and Northern Cape, South Africa.

Description
This basally-branching, succulent shrub reaches up to 2 meters in height, but is usually smaller. The thick, erect stems are slightly flattened vertically.

The leaves are assembled around the tips of the branches. Leaves are slender, long, terete and tapering (60mm x 5mm). They are blue-green from their pale waxy covering, smooth and each leaf has longitudinal lines.

Related species
Several related and similar looking species occur in the region, such as Senecio aloides and Senecio cotyledonis.

Senecio sarcoides is distinguished from Senecio aloides by its flower clusters on the tips of the stems, which are on pedicels that are of a similar length to the leaves.

Distribution
This species occurs from the Robertson Karoo in the south, northwards along the western part of South Africa, in dry areas growing in rocky soils of granite or shale.

References

sarcoides
Flora of South Africa